School spirit is the sense of identity and community shared by members of an educational institution. This can apply to any type of school, from elementary schools to universities. Members of a school can manifest spirit in the exhibition of school colors in dress and decoration, in attendance at athletic events, or verbally in the form of chants, cheers, or songs.

Educators in primary and secondary education often associate proper behavior with school spirit, especially in the context of situations when students are outside the school itself. Because student behavior reflects on the school, representing it well shows a degree of student investment in their institution's good name. This definition of school spirit is closely associated with good sportsmanship among students and their families at sporting events and is loosely based upon encouraging it
.

School pep rallies
In the United States, an event closely associated with school spirit called a pep rally is held during or after school hours. Seasonal sports teams are usually recognized. These are held generally before a varsity-level sports game. Other participants are JROTC, Cheerleaders and marching band or pep band. Many Schools in the United States do not actually have pep rallies. Instead, they have assemblies or gatherings that introduce and talk about sports, but no other events or extracurricular activities within the school.

Spirit week
Some schools engage in school spirit weeks in which each day the students are encouraged to dress to match a certain theme to show school unity and spirit. A typical example of this is "pajama day" where students and staff come to school in sleepwear. Another example is wearing the school's colors. In high schools, spirit weeks typically occur the week of homecoming. These are typically ended with a pep rally for the school.

See also
 Cheerleader
 Pep squad

References

External links
 Article from About.com

Education in the United States
Spirit, school